Wicie  is a village in the administrative district of Gmina Darłowo, within Sławno County, West Pomeranian Voivodeship, in north-western Poland. 

The village has a population of 42.

References

Wicie